The women's individual pursuit at the 2007 Dutch National Track Championships in Alkmaar took place at Sportpaleis Alkmaar from 29 to 30 December 2007. 14 athletes participated in the contest.

Ellen van Dijk won the gold medal, Marianne Vos took silver and Kirsten Wild won the bronze.

Competition format
The tournament started with a qualifying round on 29 December. The two fastest qualifiers advanced to the gold medal final on 30 December. The numbers three and four competed against each other for the bronze medal.

Results

Qualification

Finals
Bronze medal match

Gold medal match

Final results

References

2007 Dutch National track cycling championships
Dutch National Track Championships – Women's individual pursuit